Lot 43 is a township in Kings County, Prince Edward Island, Canada.  It is part of East Parish. Lot 43 was awarded to George Brydges Rodney, 1st Baron Rodney in the 1767 land lottery.

Communities
 Fortune Bridge

References

43
Geography of Kings County, Prince Edward Island